"Love Is a Rose" is a song written and composed by Neil Young. It first became popular in 1975 when Linda Ronstadt had a country hit with her version. "Love Is a Rose"  has also been covered by other artists over the years.

Neil Young version

Background
Neil Young first recorded "Love Is a Rose" in 1974 for the unreleased album Homegrown. It was later released by Young in 1977 on the compilation Decade. Homegrown finally saw release in 2020, meaning that Young's recording of the song was no longer unique to Decade.

The melody for "Love Is a Rose" was taken from another as-yet unreleased song "Dance, Dance, Dance," which finally saw release on Live at Massey Hall 1971 in 2007. Young's longtime backing band Crazy Horse recorded the song, with the title "Dance, Dance, Dance", in 1971 on their album Crazy Horse and The New Seekers released it as a single in 1972.

Linda Ronstadt version

Background
Linda Ronstadt recorded "Love Is a Rose" in a country music arrangement on her platinum-certified 1975 album Prisoner in Disguise. Her rendition peaked at No. 5 the US Billboard Country Singles chart. "Love Is a Rose" also debuted on the pop-oriented "Billboard" Hot 100 but its B-side: "Heat Wave", became the track of choice for pop radio stations, also becoming a No. 5 hit. Ronstadt frequently performed the song at her concerts during the mid-to-late-1970s.

Chart performance

Other versions
Lisa Loeb recorded "Love Is a Rose" on her 2008 album, Camp Lisa. Jill Johnson covered the song on her 2009 cover album Music Row II, after having performed the song live in a cappella versions with the band during live concerts.
Terri Clark recorded a cover of "Love Is a Rose" for her ninth studio album, Classic, which was released November 13, 2012. Clark's version was released as the album's first single in October 2012.

References

1974 songs
1975 singles
Neil Young songs
Linda Ronstadt songs
Songs written by Neil Young
Terri Clark songs
Song recordings produced by Peter Asher
Asylum Records singles
Song recordings produced by Neil Young
Song recordings produced by David Briggs (record producer)